Rootok Island (also called Aektok, Aiaktak, Ouektock, Aiaiepta, Veniaminof, or Goloi (alt: Goly; "bare") is the smallest member of the Krenitzin Islands, a subgroup of the Fox Islands in the eastern Aleutian Islands in Alaska, United States. The island's common spelling of Rooktok appears to have arisen from Aektok. Deviations in compass readings of up to 3 degrees from normal have been observed off the island's north-western side. The island was set aside to house a lighthouse on January 4, 1901; though no navigation aids were ever constructed.

References

Krenitzin Islands
Uninhabited islands of Alaska
Islands of Alaska
Islands of Aleutians East Borough, Alaska